The Last Father is a TV series.

Cast and characters
 Guj Manukyan portrays Davit
 Vardan Hovsepyan portrays Grandfather
 Arman Martirosyan portrays Ruben
 Diana Grigoryan portrays

Episodes

References

External links

 
 The Last Father on ATV
 The Last Father at the Internet Movie Database

Armenian drama television series
Armenian-language television shows
ATV (Armenia) original programming
2015 Armenian television series debuts
2010s Armenian television series
2016 Armenian television series endings